A joint effusion is the presence of increased intra-articular fluid.  It may affect any joint.  Commonly it involves the knee.

Diagnostic approach
The approach to diagnosis depends on the joint involved.  While aspiration of the joint is considered the gold standard of treatment, this can be difficult for joints such as the hip.  Ultrasound may be used both to verify the existence of an effusion and to guide aspiration.

Differential diagnosis

There are many causes of joint effusion.  It may result from trauma, inflammation, hematologic conditions, or infections.

Septic arthritis
Septic arthritis is the purulent invasion of a joint by an infectious agent with a resultant large effusion due to inflammation. Septic arthritis is a serious condition. It can lead to irreversible joint damage in the event of delayed diagnosis or mismanagement. It is basically a disease of children and adolescence.

Gout
Gout is usually present with recurrent attacks of acute inflammatory arthritis (red, tender, hot, swollen joint).  It is caused by elevated levels of uric acid in the blood that crystallizes and deposits in joints, tendons, and surrounding tissues. Gout affects 1% of individuals in Western populations at some point in their lives.

Trauma
Trauma from ligamentous, osseous or meniscal injuries can result in an effusion.  These are often hemarthrosis or bloody effusions.

Treatment

The treatment for Joint effusion include icing, rest and medication as advised by your doctor.

See also
 Swelling (medical)
 Intermittent hydrarthrosis

References

External links 

Musculoskeletal disorders
Medical signs